The  was the first medium caliber cannon totally of Japanese design and the first with a split trail carriage. The Type 14 designation was given to this gun as it was accepted in the 14th year of Emperor Taishō's reign (1925). It was used by the Imperial Japanese Army but was not considered successful and was replaced by the Type 92 10 cm cannon.

History and development

Following reports based on first-hand observation of European artillery tactics in World War I by Japanese military observers, the Imperial Japanese Army General Staff instructed the Army Technical Bureau to begin work on new designs to modernize Japan's largely antiquated artillery. One priority was the development of a medium caliber artillery piece that would be able to provide greater firepower than the standard 75mm artillery currently in front line service. However, Japan lacked much of the technical expertise or industrial infrastructure to develop such as weapon, and initial prototypes issued as the "Type 7 10cm cannon" and the "Type 12 10cm cannon" were rejected as unsatisfactory.

However, with the incorporation of advancement in design taken from contemporary Schneider designs, the Type 14 10 cm cannon was finally accepted into service in 1925. However, due to technical and budgetary issues, only a total of 64 units were produced.

Design
The Type 14 10 cm cannon was similar in design to the earlier Type 38 10 cm cannon, which was in turn based on a 1905 Krupp design, but is notable in that it was the first design done independently in Japan. It had an interrupted screw breechblock, a hydro-pneumatic recoil mechanism, heavy wooden wheels, and a split trail.

It was designed to be transportable by a team of eight draft horses. However, in 1931, a  tractor was designed for use with the Type 14, with a 50-horsepower diesel engine, which greatly increased its transportability, albeit at a top speed of eight miles per hour.

Combat record
The Type 14 10 cm cannon proved disappointing in terms of range and accuracy, and was not regarded as a successful design. The units which were completed with assigned to reserve and training units in the Japanese home islands, and were not deployed overseas in World War II.

References

Notes

Bibliography
 Bishop, Chris (eds) The Encyclopedia of Weapons of World War II. Barnes & Nobel. 1998. 
 Chamberlain, Peter and Gander, Terry. Light and Medium Field Artillery. Macdonald and Jane's (1975). 
 Chant, Chris. Artillery of World War II, Zenith Press, 2001, 
 McLean, Donald B. Japanese Artillery; Weapons and Tactics. Wickenburg, Ariz.: Normount Technical Publications 1973. .
 Mayer, S.L. The Rise and Fall of Imperial Japan. The Military Press (1984) 
 War Department Special Series No 25 Japanese Field Artillery October 1944
 US Department of War, TM 30-480, Handbook on Japanese Military Forces, Louisiana State University Press, 1994.

External links
 Type 14 on Taki's Imperial Japanese Army page
 US Technical Manual E 30-480

1
105 mm artillery
Military equipment introduced in the 1920s